The Tour du Vaucluse (Tour of the Vaucluse) is a former cycling race, held in the Vaucluse department in the Provence-Alpes-Côte d'Azur region of France. From 1923 until 1960 it was organized as a one-day race finishing in Cavaillon. Subsequently, it was held as a stage race, run over two and later three days, until the event was discontinued in 1998.

Palmarès

References

External links
 Palmarès of the Tour du Vaucluse on siteducyclisme.net

Men's road bicycle races
Cycle races in France
Vaucluse
1923 establishments in France
1998 disestablishments in France
Recurring sporting events established in 1923
Recurring sporting events disestablished in 1988
Defunct cycling races in France